Protein arginine N-methyltransferase 3 is an enzyme that in humans is encoded by the PRMT3 gene.

Model organisms 

Model organisms have been used in the study of PRMT3 function. A conditional knockout mouse line, called Prmt3tm1a(EUCOMM)Wtsi was generated as part of the International Knockout Mouse Consortium program — a high-throughput mutagenesis project to generate and distribute animal models of disease to interested scientists.

Male and female animals underwent a standardized phenotypic screen to determine the effects of deletion. Twenty seven tests were carried out on mutant mice and seven significant abnormalities were observed. Fewer than predicted homozygous mutant mice survived until weaning due to hydrocephaly. The remaining tests were carried out on both heterozygous and homozygous mutant adult mice. Male heterzygous mice had a decreased respiratory quotient. Homozygous females had decreased body weight, length and bone mineral density. Homozygous males had abnormal peripheral blood lymphocyte counts and homozygotes of both sex had eye abnormalities.

Interactions 

PRMT3 has been shown to interact with RPS2.

References

Further reading

External links 
 
 

Genes mutated in mice